Brittani Coury (born March 27, 1986 in Farmington, New Mexico) is a Winter Paralympics silver-medalist, and para-snowboarding athlete from the United States. She grew up in Durango, Colorado.

She also competed in snowboarding at the 2022 Winter Paralympics held in Beijing, China.

References

External links 
 
 
 Brittani Coury at World Para Snowboard

1986 births
Living people
American female snowboarders
Paralympic snowboarders of the United States
Snowboarders at the 2018 Winter Paralympics
Snowboarders at the 2022 Winter Paralympics
Paralympic medalists in snowboarding
Paralympic silver medalists for the United States
Medalists at the 2018 Winter Paralympics
People from Farmington, New Mexico
Sportspeople from New Mexico
People from Durango, Colorado
Sportspeople from Colorado
21st-century American women